G. P. Venkidu (1935 - 23 September 2020) was an Indian politician who was elected to the Tamil Nadu Legislative Assembly from the Gobichettipalayam constituency in the 1996 elections. He was a candidate of the Dravida Munnetra Kazhagam (DMK) party. He served until 2001. He died at a private hospital in Coimbatore aged 85 of COVID-19 during the COVID-19 pandemic in India.

References 

1935 births
2020 deaths
Deaths from the COVID-19 pandemic in India
Dravida Munnetra Kazhagam politicians
Tamil Nadu MLAs 1996–2001
People from Erode district